Graphina is a genus of script lichens in the family Graphidaceae. It has about 25 species. The genus was circumscribed in 1880 by Swiss lichenologist Johannes Müller Argoviensis. Müller Argoviensis did not indicate a type species for the genus in his original publication; David Hawksworth proposed to designate Graphina anguina as a lectotype in 1981.

Species

Graphina anguina 
Graphina austenensis 
Graphina castanocarpa 
Graphina colliculosa 
Graphina conferta 
Graphina dimidiata 
Graphina fissofurcata 
Graphina glaucoderma 
Graphina gracilescens 
Graphina hiascens 
Graphina insignis 
Graphina laevigata 
Graphina marcescens 
Graphina palmicola 
Graphina pauciloculata 
Graphina platycarpa 
Graphina polyclades 
Graphina repleta 
Graphina rubens 
Graphina sophistica 
Graphina streblocarpa 
Graphina subserpentina 
Graphina subtartarea 
Graphina subvestita

References

Ostropales
Lecanoromycetes genera
Lichen genera
Taxa described in 1880
Taxa named by Johannes Müller Argoviensis